Jerome Alan Yester (born January 9, 1943) is an American folk rock musician, record producer, and arranger.

Biography 
Yester was born in Birmingham, Alabama, United States, and grew up in Burbank, California. He formed a duo with brother Jim Yester, the Yester Brothers, and starting playing folk clubs in Los Angeles in 1960. When Jim enlisted in the army, Jerry joined The New Christy Minstrels, and then, in 1963, the Modern Folk Quartet. The MFQ released two albums in the next two years, and Yester also branched out into other recordings, playing piano on The Lovin' Spoonful's "Do You Believe in Magic" in 1965.

The MFQ split up in 1966, and Yester began work as a solo artist and as a producer, with his wife Judy Henske, his brother Jim's band the Association, The Turtles, and Tim Buckley, for whom he produced Goodbye and Hello and Happy Sad. The following year he joined The Lovin' Spoonful, replacing Zal Yanovsky, whom he also later worked with as producer, but in 1968, the Spoonful split up for 23 years. In 1969, Henske, Yester and Yanovsky put together the cult album Farewell Aldebaran, on which Yester played nearly a dozen different instruments. The following year Yester and Henske formed a new band, Rosebud, but the band dissolved in 1971; the couple then divorced.

Yester continued to work as a producer and/or arranger on albums by The Turtles, Pat Boone, Aztec Two Step, and Tom Waits, and in the 1970s, also performed with the Association and the re-formed Modern Folk Quartet. In the mid 1980s, he moved to Hawaii and formed a dance band called Rainbow Connection with his brother Jim, and Rainbow Rastasan (Rainbow Page). In 1988, the MFQ began periodic touring of Japan, and have since recorded seven CDs for Japanese labels, including one (Wolfgang) using the music of Wolfgang Amadeus Mozart.

In 1991, both Yester brothers joined a re-formed Lovin' Spoonful and Yester subsequently resided in the area of Harrison, Arkansas, where he produced and arranged in his own studio, Willow Sound.

On October 7, 2017, Yester was arrested for 30 counts of possession of child pornography in Arkansas and was released on a $35,000 bond. As a result of his arrest, he was dismissed from The Lovin' Spoonful.  He pleaded guilty to eight counts of distributing, possessing or viewing matter depicting sexually explicit conduct involving a child on October 9, 2018.

In July 2019, Yester was handed a two-year prison sentence after his conviction for child pornography possession and he was required to register as a sex offender.

References

External links
 Interview with Yester, focusing on his work with Tim Buckley
 Jerry Yester at LovinSpoonful.com
 
 

1943 births
Living people
American music arrangers
American folk musicians
American multi-instrumentalists
American people convicted of child pornography offenses
Record producers from California
American rock musicians
Musicians from Birmingham, Alabama
Musicians from Burbank, California
The Lovin' Spoonful members
Lead guitarists
American rock guitarists
American folk guitarists
American folk singers
Singer-songwriters from California
American male singers
20th-century American guitarists
American male guitarists
American male criminals
The New Christy Minstrels members
Modern Folk Quartet members
Rosebud (band) members
Singer-songwriters from Alabama